Dmitri Alexeev (Dmitrij Konstantinovič Alekseev, born 10 August 1947 in Moscow) is a Russian pianist. He studied at the Moscow Conservatory, and additionally under Dmitri Bashkirov. In the 1970s, Alexeev made his debuts in London, Vienna, Chicago, and New York City, and also won the Leeds Piano Competition in 1975.

As of 2010, he was teaching at the Royal College of Music in London. He is represented by IMG Artists.

Alexeev's repertoire, part of which has been recorded, includes works by Alexander Scriabin, Robert Schumann, Johannes Brahms, Sergei Prokofiev, Frédéric Chopin, Sergei Rachmaninoff, and Dmitri Shostakovich. He has also accompanied Barbara Hendricks.

Selected discography
Johannes Brahms: Piano Works, Ops. 76 and 116-119 / Robert Schumann: Etudes Symphoniques (EMI) 
Frédéric Chopin: Waltzes (Complete) (EMI Seraphim)
 Frédéric Chopin: Preludes (Complete) (EMI)
 Edvard Grieg / Robert Schumann: Piano Concerti - with Temirkanov, Royal PO (EMI)
 Nikolai Medtner: Piano Concerto No 1; Piano Quintet - with Lazarev, BBC SO (Hyperion)
 Sergei Prokofiev: Piano Concerti Nos. 2 & 3 - with Temirkanov, Royal PO (EMI)
 Sergei Rachmaninoff: Preludes; Morceaux De Fantasie; Moments Musicaux (Virgin Classics)
 Sergei Rachmaninoff: Rhapsody on a Theme of Paganini - with Temirkanov, St. Petersburg PO (RCA)
 Sergei Rachmaninoff: Piano Concerto No. 2; Three Preludes - with Fedoseyev, Royal PO (EMI)
 Sergei Rachmaninoff / Nikolai Medtner: Music for Two Pianos - with Nikolai Demidenko (Hyperion)
 Alexander Scriabin: Sonatas (Complete) (Brilliant Classics)
 Alexander Scriabin: Prometheus - with Muti, Philadelphia O (EMI)
 Dmitri Shostakovich: Piano Concerti Nos. 1 & 2; Assault on the Beautiful Gorky - with Maksymiuk, English Chamber O (Classics for Pleasure)

References

1947 births
Living people
Russian classical pianists
Male classical pianists
Musicians from Moscow
Prize-winners of the Leeds International Pianoforte Competition
Long-Thibaud-Crespin Competition prize-winners
Russian expatriates in the United Kingdom
21st-century classical pianists
21st-century Russian male musicians